The 2002–03 season was Aberdeen's 90th season in the top flight of Scottish football and their 92nd season overall. Aberdeen competed in the Scottish Premier League, Scottish League Cup, Scottish Cup and UEFA Cup.

Scottish Premier League

Final standings

Scottish League Cup

Scottish Cup

UEFA Cup

Squad

References

 AFC Heritage Trust

Aberdeen F.C. seasons
Aberdeen